Praça dos Três Poderes or Three Powers Plaza (more idiomatically Three Branches Plaza) is a plaza in Brasília, the capital of Brazil. The name is derived from the presence of the three branches of government around the plaza: the Executive, represented by the Palácio do Planalto (presidential office); the Legislative represented by the National Congress of Brazil; and the Judiciary, represented by the Supremo Tribunal Federal (Supreme Federal Court).

The plaza was designed by Lúcio Costa and Oscar Niemeyer as a place where the three powers would meet harmoniously. It is now also a tourist attraction.

The plaza is home to the largest flag in the world to be flown regularly (in this case, continuously). The Brazilian flag hoisted weighs about 600 kilograms (1300 pounds) and has never been taken down (not counting monthly replacements) since the capital was inaugurated on 21 April 1960. The flag is changed monthly in the presence of Presidential Guard Battalion, Independence Dragoons, other troops and sometimes the President of Brazil.

On 8 January 2023, the plaza was invaded by supporters of former president Jair Bolsonaro.

See also
List of Oscar Niemeyer works
2023 Brazilian Congress attack

References

External links
 Photos 360° of Square of the Three Powers – GUIABSB
 Changing of the Flag Ceremony in Three Powers Plaza – from YouTube

Buildings and structures in Brasília
Government buildings in Brazil
Squares in Brazil
Tourist attractions in Brasília
Modernist architecture in Brazil
Oscar Niemeyer buildings